Wara Dhammaraza (Arakanese:ဝရ ဓမ္မာရာဇာ; was a king of Mrauk-U Dynasty of Arakan.

References

Bibliography
 
 
 
 

Monarchs of Mrauk-U
17th century in Burma
17th-century Burmese monarchs